The following table lists notable online software source code playgrounds. A playground allows learning about, experimenting with and sharing source code.

Online compiled source code playgrounds

Online web client-side source code playgrounds

Online web server-side source code playgrounds

See also 
 List of compilers
 List of source code editors
 Web integrated development environment

References

External links 

Online source code playgrounds